The Wellington Daily News is an American daily newspaper published in Wellington, Kansas. It is owned by CherryRoad Media.

The paper covers the city of Wellington and Sumner County, Kansas, part of the Wichita metropolitan area.

It is one of several newspapers CherryRoad Media owns in the Wichita metropolitan area, including the dailies The Butler County Times-Gazette and The Newton Kansan.

References

External links
 

Mass media in Wichita, Kansas
Newspapers published in Kansas
Publications established in 1901
Sumner County, Kansas
Gannett publications
1901 establishments in Kansas